European Psychiatry is a peer-reviewed open-access medical journal published by Cambridge University Press on behalf of the European Psychiatric Association of which it is an official journal. It covers all aspects of psychiatry. According to the Journal Citation Reports, the journal has a 2021 impact factor of 7.156.

See also
List of psychiatry journals

References

External links

Psychiatry journals
Publications established in 1986
English-language journals
Continuous journals
Cambridge University Press academic journals